This is a list of Members of Parliament elected at the 1923 general election, held on 6 December. For a complete list of constituency elections results, see Constituency election results in the 1923 United Kingdom general election.



By elections
See the list of United Kingdom by-elections.

Sources

See also
UK general election, 1923
List of parliaments of the United Kingdom

1923
1923 United Kingdom general election
 List
UK MPs